Exotica is a studio album by Kip Hanrahan released in March 1993, featuring guests including Jack Bruce, Leo Nocentelli, and Milton Cardona. 'G-d Is Great' was co-written by Bruce.

Background 
When compared with the previous album Tenderness, Exotica was described as "a looser outing; uneven, but flowing with hotter blood".

Hanrahan spoke highly of his time recording with Jack Bruce, saying "with Jack you are spoilt, because you start out with your sketch and finish up with a gorgeous painting".

Critical reception 
Music reviewer Jack Burke described Exotica in the Lake Geneva Regional News as "soothing and provocative both, ranging far afield and home again".

Track listing

References

1993 albums
Kip Hanrahan albums